The 2014 Men's Ice Hockey World Championships was the 78th such event organised by the International Ice Hockey Federation. Teams participated at six levels of competition. The competition also served as qualifications for division placements in the 2015 competition.

Controversy

The selection of Belarus as hosts caused great controversy and initiated the Minsk2014.No Campaign. The European Parliament called the IIHF to move the venue and demanded the release of all political prisoners as a condition to continue the Championship in Minsk.

Championship

The top division championship took place with the participation of sixteen teams from 9 to 25 May 2014. Belarus hosted the event with games played in Minsk.
The IIHF's official final ranking of the tournament:

Division I

Division I A
The Division I A tournament was played in Goyang, South Korea, from 20 to 26 April 2014.

Division I B
The Division I B tournament was played in Vilnius, Lithuania, from 20 to 26 April 2014.

Division II

Division II A
The Division II A tournament was played in Belgrade, Serbia, from 9 to 15 April 2014.

Division II B
The Division II B tournament was played in Jaca, Spain, from 5 to 11 April 2014.

Division III

The Division III tournament was played in Luxembourg, Luxembourg, from 6 to 12 April 2014.

See also
2014 IIHF Women's World Championship
2014 World Junior Ice Hockey Championships
2014 IIHF World U18 Championships

References

External links
IIHF Official Website

2014
 
Men's World Ice Hockey Championships